Åmot is a municipality in Innlandet county, Norway.

Åmot or Aamot may also refer to:

Places
Åmot, Buskerud, a village in Modum Municipality in Viken county, Norway
Åmot, Seljord, a village in Seljord Municipality in Vestfold og Telemark county, Norway
Åmot, Skien, a village in Skien Municipality in Vestfold og Telemark county, Norway
Åmot, Vinje, a village in Vinje Municipality in Vestfold og Telemark county, Norway
Åmot, Sweden, a village in Ockelbo Municipality in Gävleborg county, Sweden

People with the surname
Kristoffer Aamot (1889–1955), Norwegian journalist, magazine editor, politician and cinema administrator
Rolf Aamot (born 1934), Norwegian painter,  film director, photographer and tonal-image composer

Other uses
Åmodt bro, a bridge in Oslo, Norway

See also
Amot, plural for Amah, a unit of measurement found in the Bible (see Biblical and Talmudic units of measurement)